The Eurasian Economic Union (EEU) currently comprises 5 member states, which are party to the founding treaties of the EEU and thereby subject to the privileges and obligations of membership. The constituent states of the EEU are placed under binding laws and have equal representation within the EEU's executive and judicial bodies. They do however retain considerable autonomy, and must be unanimous for the EEU to adopt policies or new member states. Consensus is a founding principle of the EEU.

In 2000 six states created the EEU's predecessor, the Eurasian Economic Community. In 2010 three core states (Russia, Belarus and Kazakhstan) pursued integration and founded the Eurasian Customs Union and the Single Economic Space. The three states are the founding members of the Eurasian Economic Union. The remaining states have acceded in subsequent enlargements. On 9 October 2014 Armenia signed the treaty and became the newest member state of the EEU on accession on 2 January 2015. Kyrgyzstan signed an accession treaty on 23 December 2014, which came into force on 6 August 2015.

Iran joined into a free trade agreement with the EEU in October 2018, following months of negotiations with Russia. The deal included 862 commodity items.

In order to accede, a state must fulfill the economic and political requirements. Enlargement of the Union is also subject to the consent of all existing members and the candidate's adoption of the existing body of EEU law and implementing previous decisions made by the Eurasian Commission, which become part of the EEU's regulatory framework.

List

Members
 (2 Jan 2015)
 (1 Jan 2015)
 (1 Jan 2015)
 (12 Aug 2015)
 (1 Jan 2015)

Observer members
 On 11 December 2020, Cuba became an observer member. Cuba becomes the first country outside Eurasia and the first country from the Americas to be granted observer status.
 On April 14, 2017, Moldova became the first observer member.
 On 11 December 2020, Uzbekistan became an observer member.

Prospective members

Free Trade Zone agreements

Free Trade Zone agreements currently under negotiation

Statistics

Population
At the moment, there are 183,438,872 people residing in the EAEU countries.
  = increase.
  = steady.
  = decrease.

HDI

Representation
Each state has representation in the institutions of the Eurasian Economic Union. Full membership gives the government of a member state one seat in the Supreme Council of the Eurasian Economic Union and the Eurasian Intergovernmental Council. All major decisions are taken by consensus, although decisions taken by the Eurasian Commission require a qualified majority vote. Votes in the commission are weighted so that every country has 3 votes. The Presidency of the Supreme Council of the Eurasian Economic Union rotates between each of the member states, allowing each state one year to help direct the agenda of the EEU.

The national governments appoint 3 members each to the Eurasian Commission (in accord with all the heads of state of the EEU), 2 members each to the Eurasian Court (in accord with other members) and the Eurasian Development Bank. Representation is therefore designed to prevent larger states from carrying more weight in negotiations.

Ratification status of treaties

Treaty on the Eurasian Economic Union

Treaty on the accession of the Republic of Armenia to the Treaty on the Eurasian Economic Union

Treaty on the accession of the Kyrgyz Republic to the Treaty on the Eurasian Economic Union

See also

Commonwealth of Independent States
Eurasian Economic Union
Eurasianism
Post-Soviet states

References

Eurasian Economic Union
Eurasian Economic Union